Fishing Island may refer to:
 Fishing Island (Manokin River) in Maryland, USA
 Senkaku Islands disputed between China and Japan